Putney Park House is a Grade II listed house at 69 Pleasance Road, Roehampton, London.

It was built in 1837–38 by the architect Decimus Burton for Robert Hutton.

References

External links
 

Houses completed in 1838
Grade II listed houses
Houses in the London Borough of Wandsworth
Grade II listed buildings in the London Borough of Wandsworth
Decimus Burton buildings